Tantalus is a Greek mythological figure who is bound in a pool of water in Tartarus, forever thirsty but never able to drink.

Tantalus may also refer to:

Tantalus (mythology) for the list of characters named Tantalus.
 Tantalus, son of Thyestes, a Greek mythological figure
 USS Tantalus (ARL-27), a United States Navy landing craft repair ship of World War II
 HMS Tantalus (P318), a British T-class submarine of World War II
 Tantalus (cabinet), a cabinet for displaying decanters but securing their contents
 Tantalus Media, an Australian video game development studio
 "The Torment of Tantalus" (Stargate SG-1), a 1997 TV series episode
 Tantalus, a prison colony in the 1966 Star Trek episode "Dagger of the Mind"
 Tantalus, A 1999 play written by John Barton and directed by Peter Hall

Animals
 Abisara tantalus, a butterfly of the family Riodinidae
 Aellopos tantalus, a moth of the family Sphingidae
 Lepidochrysops tantalus, a butterfly of the family Lycaenidae
 Mecyclothorax tantalus, a ground beetle of the family Carabidae
 Tantalus monkey (Chlorocebus tantalus), a species endemic to Ghana, Sudan, and Kenya

Places
 2102 Tantalus, an asteroid
 Mount Tantalus, southwestern British Columbia, Canada
 Tantalus Bluffs, Dufek Coast, Antarctica
 Tantalus Formation, a Mesozoic geologic formation
 Tantalus (Oahu), a peak on the Hawaiian island of Oʻahu
 Tantalus Peak, Victoria Land, Antarctica
 Tantalus Range, a mountain range in southwestern British Columbia